Insight Seminars is an international non-profit organization headquartered in Santa Monica, California. The first seminar was led in 1978 by founders John-Roger and Russell Bishop under the name Insight Training Seminars. Insight has held seminars in 34 countries for adults, teens, and children, in addition to Business Insight corporate trainings. Seminars are primarily presented in English and Spanish, and have also been translated into Russian, Portuguese, Bulgarian, and Greek.

Arianna Huffington shared about her experience with Insight Seminars and how it transformed her life.

Insight Seminar Series 

The Insight Seminar series includes five core seminars, taken in sequence, and a variety of graduate and public events. In each seminar, facilitators lead groups of 40-200+ participants through group exercises, partner discussions, lectures, and guided visualization processes.

Insight I: The Awakening Heart Seminar is the introductory 4-day seminar. Topics include personal responsibility, choice, the power of commitment, and intention.

Insight II: The Opening Heart Seminar is a 5-day seminar that provides personal attention to each participant. The focus is personal expansion, taking risks and liberation from self-imposed limitations.

Insight III: The Centering in The Heart Seminar is held over 5-days in retreat, focusing on developing the capacity to observe and respond to life's challenges with balance and compassion.

Insight IV: Knowing the Purpose of your Heart Seminar is a 28-day professional seminar designed to develop self-facilitation and personal presentation style while identifying and manifesting goals.

Insight Masters Class is a 3-month program with a curriculum focus of Living Loving.

Insight also offers the Wisdom of the Heart program with Peace Theological Seminary & College of Philosophy, with education focusing on bringing the body, heart, mind, and soul into harmony. The Wisdom of the Heart program is open to all and has no prerequisites.

Guidelines 

Participants are introduced and asked to comply with the following concepts, for the duration of the seminar.

Take care of yourself so you can help take care of others.
Don't hurt yourself and don't hurt others.
Use everything for your upliftment, growth and learning.

References

External links

 Insight Seminars Worldwide

Movement of Spiritual Inner Awareness
Group processes
Human Potential Movement
Large-group awareness training
New Age organizations
Personal development
Self religions